William Walter Wedemeyer (March 22, 1873 – January 2, 1913) was a politician from the U.S. state of Michigan.

Wedemeyer was born near Lima Township in Washtenaw County, Michigan.  He attended the district schools and Ann Arbor High School. He graduated from the law department of the University of Michigan at Ann Arbor in 1895.  He was a member of the board of school examiners from 1894 to 1895.  He was admitted to the bar in 1895 and served as county commissioner of schools from 1895 to 1897.  He served as deputy commissioner of railroads for Michigan from 1897 to 1899 and commenced the practice of law at Ann Arbor in 1899.

Wedemeyer was chairman of the Republican State convention in 1903.  He was American consul at Georgetown, British Guiana during the summer of 1905. He was a member of the Republican State central committee from 1906 to 1910.  In 1910, he was elected as a Republican from Michigan's 2nd congressional district to the 62nd United States Congress, serving from March 4, 1911 until his death on January 2, 1913.  He was an unsuccessful candidate for reelection in 1912 to the Sixty-third Congress.  While on an official visit to Colón, Panama, William Wedemeyer accidentally drowned in the harbor of that port.  His remains were never recovered.

See also
List of United States Congress members who died in office (1900–49)

References

The Political Graveyard
 William Wedemeyer, late a representative from Pennsylvania, Memorial addresses delivered in the House of Representatives and Senate frontispiece 1914

1873 births
1913 deaths
Politicians from Ann Arbor, Michigan
Deaths by drowning
Accidental deaths in Panama
University of Michigan Law School alumni
Republican Party members of the United States House of Representatives from Michigan
19th-century American politicians